Renaissance High School (RHS) is a four-year public magnet high school within the West Ada School District located in Meridian, Idaho, United States.

Academics 
Dual high school-college enrollment is available with Idaho State University. It is possible for one to receive an associate of arts degree concurrent with their high school diploma.

Students also have the choice to take international baccalaureate (IB) classes. Options include either the IB Diploma Programme or the IB Career Programme.

Renaissance is also the host of several Career and Technical Education (CTE) programs, and students travel from other West Ada schools in order to attend these classes.

Demographics
The demographic breakdown of the 742 students enrolled in 2018-2019 was:
Male - 324
Female - 418
Native American/Alaskan - 2
Asian/Pacific islanders - 59
Black - 3
Hispanic - 65
White - 576
Multiracial - 37

99 of the students were eligible for free or reduced-cost lunch.

References

External links
Official Website

Public high schools in Idaho